The Comics Journal, often abbreviated TCJ, is an American magazine of news and criticism pertaining to comic books, comic strips and graphic novels. Known for its lengthy interviews with comic creators, pointed editorials and scathing reviews of the products of the mainstream comics industry, the magazine promotes the view that comics are a fine art, meriting broader cultural respect, and thus should be evaluated with higher critical standards.

History 
In 1976, Gary Groth and Michael Catron acquired The Nostalgia Journal, a small competitor of the newspaper adzine The Buyer's Guide for Comics Fandom. At the time, Groth and Catron were already publishing Sounds Fine, a similarly formatted adzine for record collectors that they had started after producing Rock 'N Roll Expo '75, held during the July 4 weekend in 1975 in Washington, D.C.

The publication was relaunched as The New Nostalgia Journal with issue No. 27 (July 1976), and with issue No. 32 (January 1977), it became The Comics Journal ("a quality publication for the serious comics fan"). Issue No. 37 (December 1977) adopted a magazine format. With issue #45 (March 1979), the magazine moved to a monthly schedule; at that point it had a circulation of 10,000.

In addition to lengthy interviews with comics industry figures, the Journal has always published criticism—and received it in turn. Starting in the early 2000s, the Journal published a series of annual specials combining its usual critical format with extended samples of comics from specially selected contributors.

With issue No. 300 (November 2009), The Comics Journal ceased its semi-monthly print publication. TCJ shifted from an eight-times a year publishing schedule to a larger, more elaborate, semi-annual format supported by a new website. This format lasted until 2013 with issue #302. The print magazine then went on hiatus, returning to a magazine format in 2019 with issue #303.

Lawsuits 
Over the years The Journal has been involved in a handful of lawsuits. Artist Rich Buckler attempted legal action for a review that called him a plagiarist while printing his panels next to earlier and quite similar Jack Kirby art. A Groth interview with science fiction writer Harlan Ellison sparked a lawsuit by writer Michael Fleisher over an informal discussion of Fleisher's work and temperament. Co-defendants Groth and Ellison won the case, but emerged from the suit estranged.

Ellison later became a plaintiff against The Comics Journal, filing suit in part to enjoin The Comics Journal Library: The Writers, a 2006 Fantagraphics book that reprinted the Ellison interview, and which used a cover blurb calling Ellison a "Famous Comics Dilettante".  That case was ultimately settled, with Fantagraphics agreeing to omit both the blurb and the interview from any future printings of the book, Ellison agreeing to post a Groth rebuttal statement on Ellison's webpage, and both sides agreeing to avoid future "ad hominem attacks".

The Journal has on occasion published, as cover features, lengthy court transcripts of comics-related civil suits. Notable instances include the Fleisher suit and Marv Wolfman's failed suit against Marvel Comics over ownership of the character Blade.

Content 
The Journal features critical essays, articles on comics history and lengthy interviews, conducted by Gary Groth and others. Noteworthy interviews include Gil Kane in No. 38, Steve Gerber in No. 41, Harlan Ellison in No. 53, Dennis O'Neil in No. 64, Robert Crumb in No. 113, and Charles M. Schulz in #200.

According to Rick Cusick, writing in Gauntlet magazine, the Journals combination of forthright news coverage and critical analysis – although the norm for traditional journalistic enterprises – was in sharp contrast to the affectionate and promotional methods of publications like Comics Buyer's Guide and (later) Wizard. In 1995, publisher Gary Groth joked that his magazine occupied "a niche that nobody wants".

Staff members and regular contributors 
Gary Groth has been the Journals publisher and nominal editor for almost all of its existence. Staff members and regular contributors have included Kim Thompson, Greg Stump, Eric Millikin, Eric Reynolds, Ng Suat Tong, R. Fiore, R.C. Harvey, Kenneth Smith, Don Phelps, Robert Boyd, Tom Heintjes, Michael Dean, Tom Spurgeon, Robert Rodi, Gene Phillips, Marilyn Bethke, Cat Yronwode, Heidi MacDonald, Lee Wochner, Bhob Stewart, Arn Saba, Ted White, Bob Levin, Carter Scholz, and Noah Berlatsky. Guest contributors have included Dave Sim and Trina Robbins.

Managing editors 
 1987–1988: Thom Powers
 1988–1989: Greg S. Baisden
 1989–1990: Robert Boyd
 1990–September 1991: Helena Harvilicz
 September 1991–1993: Frank M. Young
 1993 – September 1993: Carole Sobocinski
 September 1993 – September 1994: Scott Nybakken
 September 1994–1999: Tom Spurgeon (also executive editor 1998–1999)
  1999–2001: Eric Evans and Darren Hick
 2001–2002: Anne Elizabeth Moore
 2002–2004: Milo George
 2004–2006: Dirk Deppey
 2006–2011: Michael Dean
 2019–2021: RJ Casey and Kristy Valenti
 2021: Rachel Miller and Kristy Valenti
 2022: Kristy Valenti and Austin English

Online editors 
 Kristy Valenti, 2010–2011
 Dan Nadel and Tim Hodler, 2011–2017
 Tim Hodler and Tucker Stone, 2017–2019
 Tucker Stone, 2017–ongoing

The Journals Top 100 Comics list 
The Journal published a 20th-century comics canon in its 210th issue (February 1999). To compile the list, eight contributors and editors made eight separate top 100 (or fewer than 100 for some) lists of American works. These eight lists were then informally combined and tweaked into an ordered list. Krazy Kat topped the list, followed by Peanuts, Pogo, and Art Spiegelman's Maus. Harvey Kurtzman had the most entries of any creator, five: his original run on Mad (#8), his "New Trend" EC war comics (#12), the 1959 Jungle Book graphic novel (#26), his Hey Look! gag cartoons (#63), and the Goodman Beaver stories (#64).

The Village Voice cited the survey's ad hoc criteria:
"Putting Bernard Krigstein and Al Feldstein's eight-page story "Master Race", Hal Foster's 34 years of work on Prince Valiant, Al Hirschfeld's theatrical caricatures, all the horror comics EC published in the first half of the '50s and Robert Crumb's sketchbooks in the same category suggests that they've cast their net a bit wide".

Among the controversial omissions to the Top 100 was Dave Sim's Cerebus series. Sim and the Journal had periodically found themselves at odds in the years preceding the list's formulation.  Issue #213 included eight pages of responses to, and defenses of the list; Journal columnist R. Fiore wrote "Dave Sim must now think you have a personal vendetta against him", and co-publisher Kim Thompson conceded: "If I had to do it over again, I'd squash together the Hernandez material into two entries [and] put Cerebus and two other things in the vacant spots".  Twelve years later, the omission was still being acknowledged by the Journal, which noted that Dave Sim's Cerebus "was conspicuously excluded".

Regarding the inclusion of superhero comics on the list, editor and survey participant Tom Spurgeon wrote: "I voted for most of the men-in-spandex titles that made the list – Spider-Man, Fantastic Four, Plastic Man – despite the sheer lousiness of some of those works' contributing elements". Ultimately, the Top 100 included six superhero works, including the deconstructionist Watchmen. Frank Miller's The Dark Knight Returns was one well-regarded mainstream superhero project that was considered but ultimately not chosen, according to co-publisher Kim Thompson.

Awards

See also 

 List of Comics Journal interview subjects—provides issue numbers with interview subjects
 Comic Art
 Sequart Organization

Notes

References 
 Groth, Gary (editor), Spurgeon, Tom (executive editor). The Comics Journal #210. Fantagraphics Books, February 1999. 
 Dean, Mike; Moore, Elizabeth Anne. "Timeline". The Comics Journal No. 235 (July 2001), p. 82.
 Dean, Mike. "The Comics Journal Examines Its Own Navel," The Comics Journal No. 235 (July 2001).
 Groth, Gary, and Robert Fiore, eds. The New Comics: Interviews from the Pages of The Comics Journal. New York : Berkley, 1988. .
 Complete collection of The Comics Journal and The Nostalgia Journal held by the Michigan State University Comic Art Collection.

External links 
 
 TCJ Covers, Contents and Mastheads at The Comics Reporter
 History of The Nostalgia Journal

Biannual magazines published in the United States
Bimonthly magazines published in the United States
Eight times annually magazines published in the United States
English-language magazines
Eisner Award winners for Best Comics-Related Periodical/Journalism
Fantagraphics titles
Magazines about comics
Magazines established in 1977
Magazines published in Seattle
Monthly magazines published in the United States
Visual arts magazines published in the United States